Ralph R. Hepburn (April 11, 1896 – May 16, 1948) was a pioneer American motorcycle racing champion and an Indianapolis 500 racecar driver.

Born in Somerville, Massachusetts, Hepburn's family moved to Los Angeles, California when he was ten years old. He began riding motorcycles as a teen and his skills led to him signing on with a cycle performing group in 1914 that toured the West Coast  and parts of the American Midwest. He then began competing in on board tracks, then on dirt. His racing career was interrupted during 1917 and 1918 due to World War I.

In June 1919, Hepburn came to national prominence when he won the  National Championship at Ascot Park in Los Angeles riding for the Harley-Davidson factory. He began winning consistently thereafter and in 1921 won the "Dodge City 300 National Championship" while breaking all existing  records. In 1922 he dominated professional track racing for the Indian  company. That year, he rode to his second victory in the  National Championship motorcycle race, this time at Meridian Speedway in Wichita, Kansas.

At the end of the 1924 American racing season, and after competing in special events in Australia, Hepburn began his auto racing career.

In 1925, he competed in a car built by Harry Miller in the first of fifteen appearances at the Indianapolis 500. Later that year, during practice for the AMA  championship race at Altoona Speedway, he crashed his Harley-Davidson racing motorcycle and damaged his hand.  Hepburn then lent the motorcycle to Indian rider Joe Petrali, who won the race and shared the prize money with him. This began Petrali's association with Harley-Davidson.

In 1929 he qualified third at Indianapolis, but gear problems resulted in him having to drop out after only fourteen laps. He finished third in 1931, and although he led the famous race three times in three different decades and had four finishes in the top five, his best result came in 1937 with a second-place finish 2.16 seconds behind Wilbur Shaw, the closest ever at that time.

For a time, Hepburn served as president of the American Society of Professional Automobile Racers. He led forty-four laps in the race before the car stalled on Lap 121.

In 1947,  Hepburn joined Preston Tucker and Tucker Corporation and drove the prototype Tucker 48 onstage when it was unveiled to the public on June 19, 1947. He served as West Coast Regional Manager for Tucker Corporation.

Hepburn died practicing for the 1948 Indianapolis 500 while driving a Novi Special for Tucker Corporation. He was survived by his wife Ida Mae Hepburn and one daughter Joanne Hepburn. He is buried at Forest Lawn Memorial Park Cemetery in Glendale, California.

In 1970, Hepburn was inducted into the Indianapolis Motor Speedway Hall of Fame, and in 1998, he was inducted into the AMA Motorcycle Hall of Fame.

Indianapolis 500 results

References

External links
Motorcycle Hall of Fame

1896 births
1948 deaths
Sportspeople from Somerville, Massachusetts
Motorcycle racers from Los Angeles
Racing drivers from Massachusetts
Racing drivers from California
Racing drivers from Los Angeles
American motorcycle racers
Indianapolis 500 drivers
AAA Championship Car drivers
Racing drivers who died while racing
Sports deaths in Indiana
Burials at Forest Lawn Memorial Park (Glendale)